Sigmund Moren (27 November 1913 – 4 February 1996) was a Norwegian philologist, encyclopedist, literary critic, theatre critic and children's writer.

Biography
Moren grew up at Trysil in Hedmark. His father was writer Sven Moren  (1871–1938). He was a brother of poet, translator and author  Halldis Moren Vesaas (1907–1995). He  was educated at the University of Oslo.  He worked for Gyldendal Norsk Forlag and later as rector of  Elverum Folk High School from 1956.
He was also a critic for the newspaper, Østlendingen. He debuted as a children's book author and won the Dammprisen in 1953.  Among his children's books were Dimmi får venner from 1952, and Nattegjester på Jonsvangen from 1957.

References

1913 births
1996 deaths
People from Trysil
University of Oslo alumni
Norwegian philologists
Norwegian educators
Norwegian encyclopedists
Norwegian literary critics
Norwegian theatre critics
Norwegian children's writers
20th-century Norwegian writers
20th-century philologists